The Arizona Cardinals are a professional American football team based in the Phoenix metropolitan area. The Cardinals compete in the National Football League (NFL) as a member of the National Football Conference (NFC) West division, and play their home games at State Farm Stadium in Glendale, a suburb northwest of Phoenix.

The team was established in Chicago in 1898 as the Morgan Athletic Club, and joined the NFL as a charter member on September 17, 1920. The Cardinals are the oldest continuously run professional football franchise in the United States, as well as one of only two NFL charter member franchises still in operation since the league's founding, the other also from Chicago, the Chicago Bears (the Green Bay Packers were an independent team and did not join the NFL until a year after its creation in 1921). The team in St. Louis was commonly referred to as the "Football Cardinals", the "Gridbirds" or the "Big Red" to avoid confusion with the Major League Baseball's (MLB) St. Louis Cardinals. Before the  season, the team moved west to Tempe, Arizona, a suburb east of Phoenix and played their home games for the next 18 seasons at Sun Devil Stadium on the campus of Arizona State University. In , the team moved to their current home field in suburban Glendale, although their executive offices and training facility remain in Tempe. From 1988 to 2012 (except 2005, when they trained in Prescott), the Cardinals conducted their annual summer training camp at Northern Arizona University in Flagstaff. The Cardinals moved their training camp to State Farm Stadium (then University of Phoenix Stadium) in 2013.

The Cardinals have won two NFL championships, both while the team were in Chicago. They returned to the title game to defend in 1948, but lost the rematch 7–0 in a snowstorm in Philadelphia.

Since winning the championship in 1947, the team suffered many losing seasons, and currently holds the longest active championship drought of North American sports at 75 consecutive seasons. In 2012, the Cardinals became the first NFL franchise to lose 700 games since its inception. They have been to the playoffs eleven times and have won seven playoff games, three of which were victories during their run in the 2008–09 NFL playoffs. During that season, they won their only NFC Championship Game since the 1970 AFL–NFL merger, and reached Super Bowl XLIII in 2009, losing 27–23 to the Pittsburgh Steelers. The team has also won five division titles (and ) since their 1947–48 NFL championship game appearances. The Cardinals are the only NFL team who have never lost a playoff game at home, with a 5–0 record: the 1947 NFL Championship Game, two postseason victories during the aforementioned 2008–09 NFL playoffs, one during the 2009–10 playoffs, and one during the 2015–16 playoffs. The Cardinals have a total of 6 playoff appearances, 3 division titles and the one NFC championship in  their 35 seasons since relocating to the Valley of the Sun in 1988.

Franchise history

Chicago Cardinals (1920–1959) 

The franchise's inception dates back to 1898, when a neighborhood group gathered to play on the South Side of Chicago, calling themselves the Morgan Athletic Club. Chicago painting and building contractor Chris O'Brien acquired the team, which he relocated to Normal Field on Racine Avenue. The team was known as the Racine Normals until 1901, when O'Brien bought used jerseys from the University of Chicago. After he described the faded maroon clothing as "Cardinal red", the team became the Racine Street Cardinals. Eventually in 1920, the team became a charter member of the American Professional Football Association (APFA), which was rechristened the National Football League (NFL) two years later. The team entered the league as the Racine Cardinals, but changed their name to the Chicago Cardinals in 1922 to avoid confusion with the Horlick-Racine Legion, who entered the league two years earlier.

NFL champions (1925) 
In 1925, the Cardinals were awarded the NFL Championship after the Pottsville Maroons were suspended for playing a game in what was deemed "another teams ". Having beat the Cardinals in a head-to-head game earlier in the season, the Pottsville Maroons won their extra game against the University of Notre Dame, helping them finish the year with the same record as the Cardinals. The Cardinals were also guilty of breaking NFL rules when they had scheduled two additional games, playing against the Hammond Pros and the Milwaukee Badgers, both of whom had already disbanded for the season. The game against the Badgers spurred a scandal when the Badgers filled out their roster with four high school players, in violation of NFL rules. The Cardinals experienced some success on the playing field during their first 26 seasons in the league.

NFL Champions (1947) 
During the post-World War II years, the team reached two straight NFL finals against the Philadelphia Eagles, winning in 1947 (eight months after Charles Bidwill's death) but losing the following year. In the late 1950s, after years of bad seasons and losing fans to their crosstown rivals, the Chicago Bears, the Cardinals were almost bankrupt, and owner Violet Bidwill Wolfner became interested in a relocation.

St. Louis Cardinals (1960–1987) 

Due to the formation of the rival American Football League, the NFL allowed Bidwill to relocate the team to St. Louis, Missouri, where they became the St. Louis Cardinals (they were locally called the "Big Red", the "Gridbirds" or the "Football Cardinals" to avoid confusion with the baseball team of the same name). During the Cardinals' 28-year stay in St. Louis, they advanced to the playoffs just three times (1974, 1975 and 1982), never hosting or winning in any appearance. The overall mediocrity of the Cardinals, combined with a then-21-year-old stadium, caused game attendance to dwindle, and owner Bill Bidwill decided to move the team to Arizona.

Phoenix/Arizona Cardinals (1988–present) 
Not long after the end of the 1987 NFL season, Bidwill agreed to move to Phoenix on a handshake deal with state and local officials, and the team became the Phoenix Cardinals (the franchise has never played in the city of Phoenix proper; however, there are several NFL teams which do not play in their market's central cities). The team changed their geographic name to the Arizona Cardinals on March 17, 1994. The 1998 NFL season saw the Cardinals break two long droughts, qualifying for the playoffs for the first time in 16 years. The team got their first postseason win since 1947 by defeating the Dallas Cowboys 20–7 in the wild-card round of the playoffs. 

In , the Cardinals, led by quarterback Kurt Warner, won the NFC Championship Game against the Philadelphia Eagles to advance to the Super Bowl for the first time in their history. They lost Super Bowl XLIII 27–23 to the Pittsburgh Steelers in the final seconds of the game.

The Cardinals clinched their second consecutive NFC West title, but were defeated by the eventual Super Bowl champion, the New Orleans Saints, 45–14 in the divisional playoffs. They set the best regular-season record in their history in Arizona at 11–5, but were defeated by the 7–8–1 NFC South champions, the Carolina Panthers.

The next year, the Cardinals set a franchise-best 13–3 record, and clinched their first-ever first-round playoff bye as the NFC's second seed. They defeated the Green Bay Packers 26–20 in overtime, giving quarterback Carson Palmer his first playoff victory. The Cardinals then advanced to their second NFC Championship Game in their history, but were blown out by the top-seeded 15–1 Panthers 49–15, committing seven turnovers.

In , the Cardinals went 11–6, posting a winning record and returning to the postseason for the first time since 2015.

Logos and uniforms

In , the team began wearing red pants with their white jerseys, as new coach Joe Bugel wanted to emulate his former employer, the Washington Redskins, who at the time wore burgundy pants with their white jerseys (the Redskins later returned to their 1970s gold pants with all their jerseys).

In , the Cardinals participated in the NFL's 75th-anniversary throwback uniform program. The jerseys were similar to those of the 1920s Chicago Cardinals, with an interlocking "CC" logo and three stripes on each sleeve. The uniform numbers were relocated to the right chest. The pants were khaki to simulate the color and material used in that era. The Cardinals also stripped the logos from their helmets for two games: at Cleveland and home vs. Pittsburgh.

The Cardinal head on the helmet also appeared on the sleeve of the white jersey from 1982 to 1995. In 1996, the state flag of Arizona was moved higher on the sleeve after the Cardinal head was eliminated as sleeves on football jerseys became shorter, and black was removed as an accent color, instead replaced with a blue to match the predominant color of the state flag. In 2002, the Cardinals began to wear all-red and all-white combinations, and continued to do so through 2004, prior to the team's makeover.

In , the team unveiled its first major changes in a century. The cardinal-head logo was updated to look sleeker and meaner than its predecessor. Numerous fans had derisively called the previous version a "parakeet". Black again became an accent color after an eight-year absence, while trim lines were added to the outside shoulders, sleeves, and sides of the jerseys and pants. Both the red and white jerseys have the option of red or white pants.

Hoping to break a six-game losing streak, the Cardinals wore the red pants for the first time on October 29, 2006, in a game at Lambeau Field against the Green Bay Packers. The Packers won 31–14, and the Cards headed into their bye week with a 1–7 mark. Following the bye week, the Cardinals came out in an all-red combination at home against the Dallas Cowboys and lost, 27–10. Arizona did not wear the red pants for the remainder of the season and won four of their last seven games. They wore red pants with white jerseys in games on the road at the Cincinnati Bengals and Seattle Seahawks. They paired red pants with red jerseys, the all-red combination, for home games against the Detroit Lions, San Francisco 49ers, Cleveland Browns, and St. Louis Rams. The red pants were paired with the white road jersey for the first time in three years during a 2010 game at Carolina, but the white jersey/red pants combination was not used again until 2018, when they broke out the combination against the Kansas City Chiefs.

The Cardinals' first home game in Arizona, in 1988, saw them play in red jerseys. Thereafter, for the next 18 years in Arizona, the Cardinals, like a few other NFL teams in warm climates, wore their white jerseys at home during the first half of the season—forcing opponents to suffer in their darker jerseys during Arizona autumns that frequently see temperatures over 100 °F (38 °C). However, this tradition did not continue when the Cardinals moved from Sun Devil Stadium to State Farm Stadium in 2006, as early-season games (and some home games late in the season) were played with the roof closed. With the temperature inside at a comfortable 70 °F (21 °C), the team opted to wear red jerseys at home full-time. The Cardinals wore white jerseys at home for the first time at State Farm Stadium on August 29, 2008, in a preseason game against the Denver Broncos.

The Cardinals wore white at home for the first time in a regular-season game at State Farm Stadium against the Houston Texans on October 11, . In October 2009, the NFL recognized Breast Cancer Awareness Month, and players wore pink-accented items, including gloves, wristbands, and shoes. The team thought the pink accents looked better with white uniforms than with red.

From 1970 through 1983, and again in many seasons between 1989 and 2002, the Cardinals would wear white when hosting the Dallas Cowboys in order to force the Cowboys to don their "jinxed" blue jerseys. They have not done this since moving into State Farm Stadium, however.

The  season saw the Cardinals debut a new, alternate black jersey. In , the Cardinals debuted an all-black set for the NFL Color Rush program. While the regular black alternates featured white lettering and are paired with white pants, the Cardinals' Color Rush alternates used red lettering and black pants for the occasion. Starting in 2022, both black uniforms would be paired with an alternate black helmet.

Rivalries

Seattle Seahawks 

One of the newer rivalries in the NFL, the Cardinals and Seahawks became divisional rivals after both were relocated to the NFC West as a result of the league's realignment in 2002. This rivalry has become one of the NFL's more bitter in recent years, as the mid-to-late 2010s often saw the Seahawks and Cardinals squaring off for NFC West supremacy. Many Cardinals fans see the Seahawks as their top rival due to their 2010s dominance under quarterback Russell Wilson and head coach Pete Carroll, although Seattle shares more intense rivalries with the San Francisco 49ers, Los Angeles Rams, and even the Green Bay Packers. Seattle leads the series 23–22–1, and the two teams have yet to meet in the playoffs.

Los Angeles Rams 

One of the oldest matchups for the Cardinals as both teams first met during the 1937 NFL Season whilst the Rams played in Cleveland, and the Cardinals were still originally located in Chicago. Their Rivalry with the Los Angeles Rams has resurged in recent years as both teams found playoff success, despite the Cardinals' best efforts; the Rams have been 9-1 since hiring head coach Sean McVay in 2017. The Week 17 matchup of the 2020 season saw both teams playing for a playoff berth; despite the injury to Rams quarterback Jared Goff, the Cardinals lost 18-7 and were eliminated from the postseason. The Cardinals' streak ended against the Rams the following season. They took the lead in the NFC over the Rams and started the season 7-0. In the following matchup, the Rams won on Monday Night Football; the Cardinals lost 6 of 10 games after their 7-0 start. The Cardinals would clinch a wild card berth after a week 17 win over the Dallas Cowboys. They played the Rams in Los Angeles and lost 34-11 as Kyler Murray threw 2 interceptions with one returned for a touchdown.

Chicago Bears 

The Cardinals' rivalry with the Bears features the only two teams that remain from the league's inception in 1920. At that time, the Bears were known as the Decatur Staleys, and the Cardinals were the Racine Cardinals. In 1922, both teams moved to Chicago, and the matchup between the teams became known as "The Battle of Chicago" for 38 years, making it the first true rivalry in the league's history. The Bears lead the all-time series 59–28–6.

Seasons and overall records

Single-season records
Points Scored: 489

Passing
 Passing yards: 4,671 – Carson Palmer
 Passing touchdowns: 35 – Carson Palmer
 Passes completed: 401 – Kurt Warner
 Passes attempted: 598 – Kurt Warner
 Longest completed pass: 98 yards – Doug Russell; Ogden Compton; Jim Hart

Rushing
 Rushing yards: 1,605 – Ottis Anderson
 Rushing attempts: 337 – Edgerrin James
 Rushing touchdowns: 16 – David Johnson
 Rushing touchdowns (rookie): 10 – Tim Hightower
 Longest rushing attempt: 83 yards – John David Crow
 Rushing yards per game: 100.3 yards – Ottis Anderson

Receiving
 Receptions: 109 – Larry Fitzgerald
 Receiving yards: 1,598 – David Boston
 Receiving touchdowns: 15 – Sonny Randle

Returns
 Punt returns in a season: 44 – Vai Sikahema
 Longest punt return: 99 yards – Patrick Peterson
 Longest kickoff return: 108 yards – David Johnson

Kicking
 Field goals: 40 – Neil Rackers
 Points after touchdown (PAT)s converted: 53 – Pat Harder
 Punts: 112 – Dave Zastudil
 Punting yards: 5,209 – Dave Zastudil

Career records
As of 2021
 Passing yards: 34,639, Jim Hart (–)
 Passing touchdowns: 209, Jim Hart (–)
 Rushing yards: 7,999, Ottis Anderson (–)
 Rushing touchdowns: 46, Ottis Anderson (–)
 Receptions: 1,234, Larry Fitzgerald (–)
 Receiving yards: 15,545, Larry Fitzgerald (–)
 Passes intercepted: 52, Larry Wilson (–)
 Field goals made: 282, Jim Bakken (–)
 Points: 1,380, Jim Bakken (–)
 Total touchdowns: 110, Larry Fitzgerald (–)
 Punt return average: 13.7, Charley Trippi (–)
 Kickoff return average: 28.5, Ollie Matson (–)
 Yards per punt average: 44.9, Jerry Norton (–)
 Sacks: 71.5, Chandler Jones (–)
 Tackles: 785, Eric Hill (1989–1997)

Players of note

Current roster

Retired numbers

Notes:
Although retired, nº 99 was re-issued to J. J. Watt after the daughter of Marshall Goldberg gave her blessing for Watt to wear it on March 2, 2021. Watt wore nº 99 for the 2021 and 2022 seasons until his retirement.

Pro Football Hall of Famers

Italics = played a portion of career with the Cardinals and enshrined representing another team
Dierdorf, Smith, Wehrli and Wilson were members of the St. Louis Football Ring of Fame in The Dome at America's Center when the Rams played there from 1995 to 2015.

Ring of Honor

It honors former Cardinal greats from all eras of the franchise's history. Following is a list of inductees and the dates that they were inducted.

Staff

The Cardinals have had 42 head coaches throughout their history. Their first head coach was Paddy Driscoll, who compiled a 17–8–4 record with the team from 1920 to 1922. Jimmy Conzelman, Jim Hanifan and Ken Whisenhunt are tied as the longest-serving head coaches in Cardinals history. On April 14, 2022, Mark Ahlemeier, the Cardinals equipment manager retired after working with the organization for 41 seasons.

Current staff

Radio and television
The Cardinals' flagship radio station is KMVP-FM; Dave Pasch, Ron Wolfley, and Paul Calvisi handle the radio broadcast. Spanish-language radio broadcasts are heard on the combo of KQMR/KHOV-FM "Latino Mix" under a contract with Univisión, signed in 2015. Prior to 2015, they were heard on KDVA/KVVA-FM "José FM", as well as co-owned KBMB AM 710. The Cardinals were the first NFL team to offer all 20 preseason and regular season games on Spanish-language radio, doing so in 2000. Luis Hernandez and Rolando Cantú are the Spanish broadcast team. The Cardinals have the most extensive Mexican affiliate network in the NFL, with contracts with Grupo Larsa (in the state of Sonora) and Grupo Radiorama (outside Sonora) and stations in 20 cities, including Hermosillo, Guadalajara and Mexico City.

As of the 2017 season, NBC affiliate KPNX broadcasts the team's preseason games on television (which, that year, included the Hall of Fame Game broadcast by NBC), called by Pasch and Wolfley, with station anchor Paul Gerke as sideline reporter. The broadcasts are syndicated regionally to KTTU and KMSB-TV in Tucson, and KVVU-TV in Las Vegas.

English radio affiliates

See also

References
Notes

Further reading
 Ziemba, Joe (2010). When Football Was Football: The Chicago Cardinals and the Birth of the NFL. Chicago: Triumph Books. .

External links

 
 Arizona Cardinals at the National Football League official website

 
Sports in Phoenix, Arizona
National Football League teams
Sports in Glendale, Arizona
American football teams in Arizona
American football teams established in 1898